Panting is a form of thermoregulation.  

Panting may also refer to:

People 
 James Harwood Panting (1854–1924), British writer
 Jonquil Panting (born 1966), British radio director
 Matthew Panting (1682–1738), English clergyman and Master of Pembroke College, Oxford
 Sean Panting (born 1970), Canadian musician, actor, and politician

Other uses 
 Panting (ship construction)
 Panting, Taunggyi, a village in Taunggyi Township, Shan State, Burma